On the first tier, Vietnam is divided into fifty-eight provinces (tỉnh) and five municipalities under the command of the central government. Municipalities are the highest-ranked cities in Vietnam. Municipalities are centrally-controlled cities and have special status equal to the provinces.

The provinces are divided into provincial cities, towns, and rural districts as the second-tier units. At the third tier, provincial city or town is divided into ward and commune, while rural district is divided into townships (thị trấn) and communes.

Governance

Provincial Committee of the Communist Party
Provincial Committee of the Communist Party (Đảng bộ Đảng Cộng sản cấp tỉnh or Tỉnh ủy Đảng Cộng sản) is a provincial subordinate of the Communist Party of Vietnam. Since Vietnam is a one party state, the provincial committee of the Communist Party is the most prominent organ of provincial governance.

Each provincial committee of the Communist Party is headed by a Secretary (Bí thư). The Secretary is de facto leader of the province.

People's Council
The legislative branch of a province is the People's Council (Hội đồng Nhân dân or HDND for short). The People's Council votes on the policy, regulations and orders for development of the province.

Members of People's Council are called delegates or councillors (đại biểu) and are elected by people living within that province. It is equivalent to the legislative National Assembly of Vietnam. The People's Council is headed by a Chairman (Chủ tịch) and a Vice Chairman (Phó Chủ tịch).

The number of councillors varies from province to province, depending on the population of that province. The People's Council appoints a People's Committee, which acts as the executive arm of the provincial governance. This arrangement is a somewhat simplified version of the situation in Vietnam's national government. Provincial governments are subordinates to the central government.

People's Committee
The executive branch of a province is the People's Committee (Uỷ ban Nhân dân or UBND for short). The People's Committee is responsible for implementing policy and executing laws and orders. The People's Committee is equivalent to the executive Government of Vietnam. People's Committee also manages the provincial departments (Sở) which are equivalent to the Ministries.

Members of the People's Committee are called commissioners (Ủy viên). The People's Committee is headed by a Chairman (Chủ tịch) and Vice Chairmen (Phó Chủ tịch), and consists of between 4 and 7 commissioners. The number of commissioners depends on the population of the province. The Chairman and Vice Chairmen of the People's Committee are also councillors of the People's Council.

People's Court
The judiciary branch of a province is the People's Court (Tòa án Nhân dân or TAND for short). The People's Court is responsible for judiciary processes and trials. The People's Court is equivalent to the judiciary Supreme People's Court of Vietnam.

The People's Court is headed by a Chief Judge (Chánh án) and consists of a number of judges (thẩm phán).

Police Department
Provincial police department is under direct command of the Ministry of Public Security.

State Treasury

Provincial Military Command

List and statistics

According to the census results of January 2023, the population of Vietnam is 96,994,000 people. The most populous top-level administrative unit in Vietnam is Hồ Chí Minh City, one of the five  centrally governed cities. It has 9,005,000 people living within its official boundaries. The second most populous administrative unit is the recently expanded Hà Nội with 8,079,000  people. Prior to the expansion of the capital city, this rank belonged to Thanh Hóa with 3,626,000 people. The least populous is Bắc Kạn, a mountainous province in the remote northeast with 325,000 people.

In land area, the largest province is Nghệ An, which runs from the city of Vinh up the wide Sông Cả valley. The smallest is Bắc Ninh, located in the populous Red River Delta region.

The following is a table of Vietnam's provinces broken down by population and area, January 2023, based on 2023 Census and 2018 area data from Ministry of Natural Resources and Environment.

See also List of postal codes in Vietnam

Regions

The Vietnamese government often groups the various provinces into eight regions, which are often grouped into three macro-regions: Northern, Central and Southern. These regions are not always used, and alternative classifications are possible. The regions include:

 Municipality (thành phố trực thuộc trung ương)

Historical provinces of Vietnam
 Ái Châu - existed during the third Chinese domination.
 An Xuyên - existed from 1956 until the Vietnamese reunification of 1976.
 Biên Hòa - existed from 1832 until the Vietnamese reunification of 1976.
 Bình Trị Thiên - administrative grouping of Quảng Bình, Quảng Trị and Thừa Thiên provinces between 1976 and 1992.
 Bình Tuy - existed from 1956 until the Vietnamese reunification of 1976.
 Chợ Lớn - existed from 1900 until 1957.
 Chương Thiện - existed from 1961 until the Vietnamese reunification of 1976.
 Cửu Long - administrative grouping of Vĩnh Long and Vĩnh Bình provinces between 1976 and 1992.
 Định Tường - existed from 1832 until the Vietnamese reunification of 1976.
 Gia Định - existed from 1832, became Hồ Chí Minh City following the Vietnamese reunification of 1976.
 Gò Công - existed from 1900 until the Vietnamese reunification of 1976.
 Hà Bắc - administrative grouping of Bắc Giang and Bắc Ninh provinces between 1962 and 1996.
 Hà Tây - existed from 1965 to 1975 and 1991 until 2008, when it was merged into Hà Nội.
 Hải Hưng - administrative grouping of Hải Dương and Hưng Yên provinces between 1968 and 1996.
 Hậu Nghĩa - existed from 1963 until the Vietnamese reunification of 1976.
 Long Khánh - existed from 1956, became Đồng Nai province following the Vietnamese reunification of 1976.
 Minh Hải - administrative grouping of Cà Mau and Bạc Liêu provinces between 1976 and 1996.
 Nghệ Tĩnh - administrative grouping of Nghệ An and Hà Tĩnh provinces between 1976 and 1991.
 Phước Long - existed from 1956 until the Vietnamese reunification of 1976.
 Phước Thành - existed from 1959 until 1965.
 Phước Tuy - existed from 1956 until the Vietnamese reunification of 1976.
 Quảng Tín - existed from 1962 until the Vietnamese reunification of 1976.
 Sa Đéc - existed from 1900 until the Vietnamese reunification of 1976.
 Sông Bé - administrative grouping of Bình Dương and Bình Phước provinces between 1976 and 1997.
 Tân An - existed from 1900 until 1956.
 Vĩnh Bình - existed from 1956 until the Vietnamese reunification of 1976.

See also
 ISO 3166-2:VN

Notes

References

External links
 CityMayors.com article
  Comprehensive map of Vietnam's provinces c. 1890

 
Subdivisions of Vietnam
Provinces
Vietnam 1
Provinces, Vietnam
Vietnam geography-related lists